The  (Forest Quarter;) is the northwestern region of the northeast Austrian state of Lower Austria. Geologically it is a part of the Bohemian Massif. In the south are the Wachau and Kamptal wine regions.

Districts
The following administrative districts of Lower Austria are considered to be parts of the 
 
 
 
 
 
 northern part of 
 statutory city of Krems an der Donau

Further reading 
 Birgit Zotz, Das Waldviertel - Zwischen Mystik und Klarheit. Das Image einer Region als Reiseziel. Berlin: Köster 2010,

External links 
 
Official website 
 Waldviertel Wiki 

Geography of Lower Austria